WEGZ is a Christian radio station licensed to Washburn, Wisconsin, broadcasting on 105.9 MHz FM.  The station is owned by VCY America.

Programming
WEGZ's programming includes Christian Talk and Teaching programming including; Crosstalk, Worldview Weekend with Brannon Howse, Grace to You with John MacArthur, In Touch with Dr. Charles Stanley, Love Worth Finding with Adrian Rogers, Revive Our Hearts with Nancy Leigh DeMoss, The Alternative with Tony Evans, Liberty Council's Faith and Freedom Report, Thru the Bible with J. Vernon McGee, Joni and Friends, Unshackled!, and Moody Radio's Stories of Great Christians.

WEGZ also airs a variety of vocal and instrumental traditional Christian Music, as well as children's programming such as Ranger Bill.

History
The station began broadcasting October 5, 1981, holding the call sign WBWA. The station aired a MOR format, and was owned by Silver Birch Broadcasting.

In 1990, the station was sold to DDS Communications for $98,000 and the station's call sign was changed to WEGZ. WEGZ would adopt a country music format and was branded "Eagle Country 106".

The station adopted its present format on January 1, 2002. DDS Communications, the licensee of WEGZ, was sold to VCY America for $465,000 shortly thereafter.

See also
 VCY America
 List of VCY America Radio Stations

References

External links
 VCY America official website
 

EGZ
Radio stations established in 1981
1981 establishments in Wisconsin
VCY America stations